Archenemy is a 2020 independent superhero mystery-thriller film written and directed by Adam Egypt Mortimer based on a story Mortimer created with Lucas Passmore. Joe Manganiello, who also produced the film, stars in the lead role alongside Skylan Brooks, Paul Scheer, Glenn Howerton, Zolee Griggs, and Amy Seimetz.

Archenemy had its world premiere at Beyond Fest on October 7, 2020. The film was released on December 11, 2020 by RLJE Films.

Premise 
A teenager meets a mysterious man named Max Fist, who claims he lost his superpowers after arriving from another dimension. Together, they take to the streets to wipe out a vicious crime boss and his local drug syndicate.

Cast
 Joe Manganiello as Max Fist
 Skylan Brooks as Hamster
  Zolee Griggs as Indigo
 Paul Scheer as Krieg
 Amy Seimetz as Cleo Ventrik
 Glenn Howerton as The Manager

Production
In November 2019, it was announced Joe Manganiello, Glenn Howerton and Amy Seimetz had joined the cast of the film, with Adam Egypt Mortimer directing from a screenplay he wrote, from a story by Mortimer and Lucas Passmore, with Joe Manganiello will produce along with Daniel Noah, Elijah Wood, Kim Sherman, Lisa Whalen and Nick Manganiello.

Principal photography began on December 9, 2019 and concluded in January 2020.

Release
In July 2020, it was announced RLJE Films had acquired distribution rights to the film. It had its world premiere at Beyond Fest on October 7, 2020. It will also screen at the  Sitges Film Festival in October 2020. It was released on December 11, 2020.
On its first weekend the film grossed $54,570. And on its second weekend $27,640. On its third weekend the film grossed $24,851. On its fourth weekend $9,897 more.

Reception
The website's critics consensus reads: "Archenemy fails to follow through on some of its more interesting ideas, but Joe Manganiello's lead performance and the picture's infectious raw energy make for a fun action-adventure." Metacritic reports a score of 57 out of 100 based on seven critic reviews, indicating "mixed or average reviews".

Possible sequel
In December 2020, while speaking to Bloody Disgusting, Mortimer confirmed a "Vortex Trilogy" consisting of Daniel Isn't Real, Archenemy, and a planned third film, saying "mark my words we are going to make a third movie in the Vortex Trilogy that will have Daniel return and force Max, in some form, to deal with it. A crisis on infinite vortices pulling together as many of the characters from both stories as we can fit for a true cosmic horror/cosmic action crossover hybrid!"

References

External links
 
 

2020 films
2020 action thriller films
2020s superhero films
American superhero films
American action thriller films
British action thriller films
Voltage Pictures films
2020s English-language films
Films directed by Adam Egypt Mortimer
2020s American films
2020s British films